

70001–70100 

|-id=030
| 70030 Margaretmiller ||  || Margaret Joan Miller (born 1956), wife of American astronomer Brian Warner who discovered this minor planet. A graduate of Indiana University, she is an accomplished violist who, as a member of the DaVinci Quartet, was a prize winner in two major international competitions. She now devotes her time to teaching viola and violin to students of all ages (Src). || 
|}

70101–70200 

|-id=179
| 70179 Beppechiara ||  || Giuseppe Brenna (born 1952) and his wife Chiara Martinoni (born  1953), two Swiss alpinists who live in a small village in the Verzasca valley in the canton of Ticino. He has climbed to the top of all 630 mountains in Ticino of altitude greater than 2000 meters and has written several guides and books about Swiss mountains. || 
|}

70201–70300 

|-id=207
| 70207 Davidunlap ||  || David Alexander Dunlap (1863–1924), born in Pembroke, Ontario, a mining magnate, philanthropist and amateur astronomer, was the namesake of the David Dunlap Observatory, location of Canada's largest optical telescope, and where the first black-hole candidate Cygnus X-1 was discovered and confirmed. || 
|-id=210
| 70210 Cesarelombardi ||  || Cesare Lombardi (1900–1971) was a volunteer assistant at the Brera Astronomical Observatory in Milan from 1930, where he devoted himself to the observation and calculation of orbits of minor planets. From 1930 to 1941 and from 1949 to 1971 he was director of the Hoepli planetarium in Milan. || 
|}

70301–70400 

|-bgcolor=#f2f2f2
| colspan=4 align=center | 
|}

70401–70500 

|-
| 70401 Davidbishop ||  || David Bishop (born 1961) is an engineer who works with cutting-edge CMOS and other imaging technology. For many years he has donated his time and tirelessly maintained the only webpage that provides up-to-date reports and images of all supernova discoveries. This is used daily by hundreds of astronomers. || 
|-id=409
| 70409 Srnín ||  || The Czech village of Srnín is situated at the foot of Kleť mountain. It was founded by Zlatá Koruna monastery and first mentioned in 1400. || 
|-id=418
| 70418 Kholopov ||  || P. N. Kholopov (1922–1988) was the astronomer editor-in-chief of the first three volumes of the fourth edition of the General Catalogue of Variable Stars. || 
|-id=444
| 70444 Genovali ||  || Katia Genovali (born 1978) is a young astrophysicist who works on cataclysmic and symbiotic variables at the University of Pisa. Apart from her astrophysical work she is very active in the public understanding of science and astronomy. || 
|-id=446
| 70446 Pugh ||  || George Pugh (1926–), American physicist, first to propose (in 1959), a test of general relativity's frame dragging via a combination telescope/gyroscope in a drag-free satellite: Gravity Probe B (2004). || 
|-id=449
| 70449 Gruebel ||  || Robert W. Gruebel (1924–2016) was a Professor of Physics at Stephen F. Austin State University, and a mentor, colleague and friend of the discoverer.  (The minor planet was discovered at the University's Observatory.) || 
|}

70501–70600 

|-bgcolor=#f2f2f2
| colspan=4 align=center | 
|}

70601–70700 

|-id=679
| 70679 Urzidil ||  || Johannes Urzidil, Czech-German writer, poet and journalist †  || 
|}

70701–70800 

|-id=710
| 70710 Chuckfellows ||  || Charles Fellows (born 1962), the Project Manager for the OSIRIS-REx Camera Suite. He was also the Lead and Systems Engineer for the Mars Odyssey Gamma Ray Spectrometer, the Thermal Evolved Gas Analyzer on the Phoenix Mars Lander, and was a team member for the DISR instrument that flew on the Cassini mission. || 
|-id=711
| 70711 Arlinbartels ||  || Arlin Bartels (born 1965), the Flight System Manager for the OSIRIS-REx Asteroid Sample Return Mission. Prior to serving in the role, he was the MLA Instrument Manager for MESSENGER, the Lunar Reconnaissance Orbiter Instrument Systems Manager, and the JPSS Deputy Project Manager. || 
|-id=712
| 70712 Danieljoanna ||  || Daniel Rose (born 1929) and Joanna Rose (born 1930) had the vision to support "Cosmos: A Spacetime Odyssey, through their philanthropic interest in social justice, education, science literacy, and the health and wealth of the human species," becoming an acclaimed 13-part TV series, airing in 45 languages and 180 countries. || 
|-id=713
| 70713 Sethmacfarlane ||  || Seth MacFarlane (born 1973) writer, actor, and producer, is a founding member of the Board of Advisors to the Science and Entertainment Exchange, a Los Angeles branch office of the National Academy of Sciences. He would later serve as an Executive Producer of the 2014, 13-part TV series "Cosmos: A Spacetime Odyssey" || 
|-id=714
| 70714 Rizk ||  || Bashar Rizk (born 1959) is the Instrument Scientist for the OSIRIS-REx Camera Suite (OCAMS). He was also a Co-Investigator, Image Team Leader, Senior Data Analyst, and Systems and Calibration Engineer for the Descent Imager Spectral Radiometer (DISR) instrument that took the first images of the surface of Titan. || 
|-id=715
| 70715 Allancheuvront ||  || Allan Cheuvront (born 1950) is the Ground System Test Lead for the OSIRIS-REx Asteroid Sample Return Mission. Prior to serving in this role, he was the Mission Operations Manager for OSIRIS-REx, as well as the Stardust comet sample return mission, and a flight team member on the Magellan mission to Venus. || 
|-id=716
| 70716 Mehall ||  || Greg Mehall (born 1963), Project Engineer for the Thermal Emission Spectrometer flying on the OSIRIS-REx Asteroid Sample Return Mission. He was also instrument manager, systems engineer, and mission manager for the Mars Global Surveyor TES, Mars Odyssey THEMIS, and Mars Exploration Rovers Mini-TES instruments. || 
|-id=718
| 70718 HEAF ||  || The Harlem Educational Activities Fund (HEAF) provides nurturing, educational opportunities for motivated students who are otherwise underserved in their home or community. Founded in 1989 by philanthropist Daniel Rose, HEAF measures its success by the stellar college and graduate school admission rates it fosters. || 
|-id=720
| 70720 Davidskillman ||  || David R. Skillman (born 1945) for his decades-long contributions to asteroid searching, stellar binary star systems and as lead systems engineer for the Hubble Space Telescope at Goddard Space Flight Center. || 
|-id=728
| 70728 Gal-Edd ||  || Jonathan Gal-Edd (born 1954) is the Ground Systems Manager for the OSIRIS-REx Asteroid Sample Return Mission. He was also the Ground System Chief Engineer for the Landsat Data Continuity Mission, and the Ground Segment Mission Engineering Manager for the James Webb Space Telescope. || 
|-id=737
| 70737 Stenflo ||  || Jan Olof Stenflo (born 1942) a Swedish-Swiss astronomer, served as director of the Institute of Astronomy, ETH Zurich, during 1980–2006, after a lectureship at Lund University. His scientific work included contributions to the study of polarized light and solar magnetic fields. He supported the establishment of the Istituto Ricerche Solari Locarno. || 
|-id=744
| 70744 Maffucci ||  || Paolo Maffucci (born 1936) is an amateur astronomer at San Marcello Pistoiese who is particularly interested in promoting astronomy. || 
|-id=745
| 70745 Aleserpieri ||  || Alessandro Serpieri (1823–1885) was an Italian astronomer and teacher of mathematics and physics. He determined the Perseid radiant and studied the solar eclipse of 1870 Dec. 22. He also analyzed the Italian earthquakes of 1872 and 1875. || 
|-id=781
| 70781 Donnelly ||  || Michael Donnelly (born 1961), the Project Manager for the OSIRIS-REx Asteroid Sample Return Mission. Prior to serving in this role, he was the First Servicing Mission Systems Manager for the Hubble Space Telescope, the AQUA Spacecraft Manager, and the GOES-R Project Manager. || 
|-id=782
| 70782 Vinceelliott ||  || Vincent Elliott (born 1970) is the Deputy Project Manager for Resources for the OSIRIS-REx Asteroid Sample Return Mission. Prior to serving in this role, he was the Deputy Project Manager for Resources for the Hubble Space Telescope and the NASA Astrophysics Projects Division Program Business Manager. || 
|-id=783
| 70783 Kenwilliams ||  || Kenneth Williams (born 1956) is a member of the navigation team at KinetX, Inc. for the OSIRIS-REx Asteroid Sample Return Mission. He was the Navigation Team Chief for the MESSENGER orbiter and the Stardust Missions, the Lead Maneuver Analyst for the Genesis mission, and a Mission Planner for the Cassini mission. || 
|}

70801–70900 

|-id=850
| 70850 Schur ||  || Chris Schur (born 1958) and Dawn Schur (born 1960), American amateur astronomers and amateur paleontologists living in Payson, Arizona. Their astrophotography at their home observatory is of the highest quality and the analysis and cataloging of fossils posted on their extensive website, is quite professional. || 
|}

70901–71000 

|-id=936
| 70936 Kámen ||  || The Czech , is an originally Gothic castle in southern Bohemia near the town of Pacov, first mentioned in the fourteenth century. In the nineteenth century the castle was reconstructed in the English Romantic Gothic style. There is a motorcycle museum there now (Src). || 
|-id=942
| 70942 Vandanashiva ||  || Vandana Shiva (born 1952) is an Indian environmental activist. In 1993 she received the Right Livelihood Award "for placing women and ecology at the heart of modern development discourse" || 
|-id=995
| 70995 Mikemorton ||  || Michael Morton (1959–1999) was the consummate amateur astronomer, George Observatory volunteer and friend. The continuing success of the Texan observatory is directly related to his knowledge, skills, hard work and dedication. Mike was also a beloved member of the Fort Bend Astronomy Club. || 
|-id=000
| 71000 Hughdowns ||  || Hugh Downs (1921-2020), an American television pioneer, program host, journalist and prolific author. He is also a board of governors member of the National Space Society and was a longtime president and chairman of the predecessor National Space Society. The name was suggested by M. Trueblood. || 
|}

References 

070001-071000